Uwe Rapolder (born 29 May 1958) is a German retired football player and manager.

References

External links
 

1958 births
Living people
People from Heilbronn (district)
Sportspeople from Stuttgart (region)
Footballers from Baden-Württemberg
German footballers
Association football midfielders
K.R.C. Genk players
Lierse S.K. players
FC Winterthur players
Tennis Borussia Berlin players
SC Freiburg players
FC Martigny-Sports players
BSC Young Boys players
2. Bundesliga players
German football managers
Bundesliga managers
Karlsruher SC managers
FC St. Gallen managers
Arminia Bielefeld managers
1. FC Köln managers
SV Waldhof Mannheim managers
Rot Weiss Ahlen managers
2. Bundesliga managers
3. Liga managers
SG Sonnenhof Großaspach managers
TuS Koblenz managers
German expatriate footballers
Expatriate footballers in Belgium
German expatriate sportspeople in Belgium
Expatriate footballers in Switzerland
German expatriate sportspeople in Switzerland
German expatriate football managers
Expatriate football managers in Switzerland